Všestudy is a municipality and village in Mělník District in the Central Bohemian Region of the Czech Republic. It has about 400 inhabitants.

Administrative parts
The village of Dušníky nad Vltavou is an administrative part of Všestudy.

Geography
It lies in a flat agricultural landscape in the Central Elbe Table. The Vltava River briefly forms part of the municipal border in the north.

History
The first written mention of Všestudy is from 1295.

Transport
the D8 motorway from Prague to Ústí nad Labem passes through the municipality.

Sights
There are no cultural monuments in the municipality.

References

External links

Villages in Mělník District